Winter Gold is a 1996 winter sports video game developed by Funcom and published by Nintendo for the Super Nintendo Entertainment System. In the game, players participate in six winter sports disciplines across four distinct olympic venues. Its gameplay focuses on time trials in three playable modes, using a main five-button configuration.

Winter Gold was conceived under the working title FX Skiing by producer Erik Gloersen, who wanted to make an official Winter Olympic title for Lillehammer but the idea never came to fruition. The team wanted to avoid on-rails gameplay when developing games that are played over FMV backgrounds like Star Wars: Rebel Assault, with the staff coming up with a track-system that made possible to create an infinite number of courses out of distinct parts. The 3D visuals were powered by the Super FX2 chip, an enhancement of Argonaut Softwares Super FX processor previously used in Doom and Yoshi's Island.

Winter Gold garnered mixed reception from critics since its release; praise was given to the presentation, fast pacing, 3D polygon graphics, techno-style soundtrack and controls but some felt mixed in regards to the gameplay and sound design while the lack of replay value, limited color palette and letterboxed resolution were criticized.

Gameplay 

Winter Gold is a winter sports game where players can choose between six disciplines such as downhill, ski jumping, snowboarding, aerial skiing, bobsled and luge across four distinct olympic venues: Salt Lake City, Lillehammer, Albertville and a unlockable city. Prior to starting the game, players choose the color of their gear (suit, helmet and boots) and nationality.

There are three modes of play: Practice, Competition and Circuit. In both practice and competition modes, players can choose an opponent and a few disciplines or just one discipline to participate in order to obtain the best possible time record or score, which are saved automatically via the cartridge's internal battery-backed memory. In circuit mode, the player can also participate on any discipline but must compete against other participants. The player advances into the next olympic venue by reaching the top three positions depending on the time rankings or standing points obtained after finishing each discipline. In addition to the single player mode, there is also a multiplayer mode where up to eight players participate in competition mode.

In downhill, players must descend the hill as fast as possible and crossing red flag gates to avoid time penalty, while avoiding obstacles along the way. At the starting gate, players must press left and right on the d-pad to gain initial speed. In ski jumping, players aim to achieve the longest possible jump after descending from a ramp and adjust their landing position to gain points depending on style and distance. In snowboarding, players must obtain points on a half-pipe under a strict time limit by performing tricks and combos via button combinations. Aerial skiing is similar to the snowboarding discipline but players jump from a ramp and perform a good landing. In both bobsled and luge, players must press left and right on the d-pad to gain initial speed at the starting gate and get to the bottom of the course in the fastest time possible. Players must also avoid hitting side rails to not lose speed.

Development and release 
Winter Gold was developed by Funcom and published by Nintendo for the Super Nintendo Entertainment System in November 1996. The game was housed in a 16-megabit (2 MB) cartridge using the Super FX2 enhancement chip, a revision of the Super FX processor developed by Argonaut Software that was previously used in Doom and Yoshi's Island. The FX2 chip runs at 21.4 MHz, with extra pins soldered in the PCB to increase the supported ROM size and framebuffer. Olav Mørkrid, who previously worked on Daze Before Christmas, served as lead programmer. Lead graphic artist Rune Spaans, who was hired by Funcom in 1994, was in charge of the 3D models, while co-programmers Frank Stevenson and Paul Endre Endresen were responsible for the 3D tracing and physics respectively. Additional artwork was handled by Daniel Staver and Dennis Hansen. Both Mørkrid and Spaans recounted the project's development process and history in a 2018 interview and Spaans' own personal website.

Mørkrid stated that Winter Gold was conceived under the working title FX Skiing by producer Erik Gloersen, who wanted to make an official Winter Olympic title for Lillehammer but this idea did not come to fruition. He questioned Gloersen about developing a winter sports game despite similar titles not being good, with the latter replying: "That's exactly why we’re gonna make a great one". Spaans claimed that both backgrounds and video sequences were converted into vector graphics, while the sports events were animated in 3D. The introduction was created using real sportsmen. Spaans revealed that the graphics were realized with 3D Studio using DOS computers, while characters were done with Alias PowerAnimator using a SGI workstation provided by Nintendo that cost $50,000.

Spaans stated that the team wanted to avoid on-ralis gameplay when developing games that are played over FMV backgrounds such as Star Wars: Rebel Assault, with the staff coming up with a track-system that made possible to construct an infinite number of courses out of eight distinct parts and having similar frames on each sequence to use as a transition into a new track section. Spaans also stated that it was difficult merging characters into the backgrounds but Mørkrid claimed that "the game would have never been" without the involvement of Spaans, Stevenson and Endre Endresen. Maniacs of Noise member Jeroen Tel was responsible for both music and sound. Winter Golds music is reminiscent of house music with rap and funky elements.

Reception 

Winter Gold received mixed reception from critics since its release. Hobby Consolass Roberto Lorente praised the fast-paced polygon graphics, sound design, playability and fun factor but found the game's color palette as not very flashy. Total!s Frederic Berg commended the gameplay, polygon visuals and techno-style music and sound design but criticized the lack of replay value to motivate multiple play sessions.

MAN!ACs Martin Gaksch gave positive remarks to the funky presentation, interesting 3D polygon visuals and fast pacing of each discipline but felt mixed in regards to the sound and criticized the poor color palette, echoing the same sentiment as Lorente, as well as the letterboxed resolution. Video Games Thomas Wiesner regarded the fast-paced 3D graphics as very impressive for Super NES standards, innovations of each discipline, controls, music and sound design but, like Berg, he criticized the lack of gameplay variety in Winter Gold outside of improving personal time records and competing against AI opponents. In a similar was as Lorente and Gaksch, Mega Funs Christoph Pütz criticized the lack of colors but commended the soundtrack.

References

External links 

 Winter Gold at GameFAQs
 Winter Gold at Giant Bomb
 Winter Gold at MobyGames

1996 video games
Funcom games
Multiplayer and single-player video games
Nintendo games
Skiing video games
Snowboarding video games
Super FX games
Super Nintendo Entertainment System games
Super Nintendo Entertainment System-only games
Sports video games set in France
Sports video games set in Japan
Sports video games set in the United States
Video games developed in Norway
Video games scored by Jeroen Tel
Video games set in Norway
Winter sports video games